The timeline of nursing history in Australia and New Zealand stretches from the 19th century to the present.

19th century

1810s
1811 – The opening of Sydney Hospital. Convict men and women undertook the nursing.

1820s
Sydney hospital attended the site of the first public hospital in Australia, the Rum Hospital, which was first opened and completed in July 1820s.

1830s
1838 – The first trained nurses arrive in Sydney, five Irish Sisters of Charity.

1840s
1840 – Settlement of New Zealand as a colony and the establishment of state hospitals.
1841 – People considered to be mentally ill were considered criminals. The first case of insanity in New Zealand's society was recorded in 1841 (Papps, E, 2002).
1847 – Wellington Hospital was established, The first New Zealand Hospital. Giselle's Journal, http://mylittleculturediary.blogspot.co.nz/2012/02/first-new-zealand-hospital-labyrinth.html  (Barber, L., & Towers, R. (1976). Wellington Hospital 1847–1976. Wellington: Wellington Hospital Board.)
1848 – The Yarra Bend Asylum was opened so that those mentally ill could be moved out of gaol. This Asylum was later known as Melbourne.

1850s
1854 – The first lunatic asylum was built, in Wellington, New Zealand.
1860–1883 – Approximately 16,378 single women emigrated to New Zealand; 582 identified their occupation as a nurse, monthly nurse, sick nurse, trained nurse, nurse girl, midwife, hospital nurse or professional nurse. Orchard, S. (1997). More ‘ woman of good character': Nurses who came to New Zealand as immigrant settlers.
1868 – Lucy Osburn and her four Nightingale nurses arrived at Sydney Infirmary (to become Sydney Hospital). They soon start the first nursing school.

1870s
1870 – New Zealand had 37 hospitals as a result of the population increase of the gold rush.

1880s
1885 – following the Hospital and Charitable Aids Act conditions improved.

1890s
1899 – Australasian Trained Nurses Association was founded in New South Wales.
1899–1902 – The years of the South African War. During the 1899–1902 South African (Boer) War, nurses from each state in Australia joined volunteer troops, serving as private citizens or with the British nursing forces. Daly, J. Jackson, D. Speedy, S. (2010). Contexts of nursing (3rd ed.). Chatswood, NSW 2067. Australia. Cecotti,L. Prejudice times meant that although hundreds of female nurses applied there was conflict with those already in the military. Few however did serve in South Africa.

20th century

1900s
1900 – The Private Hospital, Wakefield Street in Adelaide becomes the first training hospital for nurses in the colony of South Australia, under Alice Tibbits (1854–1932).
1901 – New Zealand is the first country to regulate nurses nationally, with adoption of the Nurses Registration Act
1901 – Royal Victorian Trained Nurses' Association is formed.
1902 – Ellen Dougherty of New Zealand becomes the first registered nurse in the world on 10 February.
1902 – The Queen Alexandra's Imperial Military Nursing Service replaces, by royal warrant, the Army Nursing Service.
1908 –  Ākenehi Hei, of the Whakatohea and Whanau-a-Apanui tribes, was the first Maori registered nurse in New Zealand.
1908 – Kai Tiaki, the first New Zealand nursing journal, is published.
1909 – A new role called 'backblocks' nursing was introduced to New Zealand providing services to rural parts of the country

1910s
1910 – Ākenehi Hei, the first qualified Maori nurse in New Zealand, dies on 28 November 1910 after contracting typhoid from family members she was nursing.
1915 – The New Zealand Army Nursing Service set up in 1915, largely at the urging of Hester Maclean (1863–1932).

1920s
1925 – New Zealand attempts to have a degree nursing programme available at the University of Otago.

1930s
1938 – The New Zealand Social Security Act of 1938 marks the introduction of a comprehensive health system that mandated the provision of free care for all.
1939 – Registering of nursing aides commenced in New Zealand
1939–1945 – Australian and New Zealand nurses serve outside their countries in World War II.

1940s
1942 – Banka Island massacre: Twenty-one Australian nurses, survivors of a bombed and sunken ship, are executed by bayonet or machine gun by Imperial Japanese Army soldiers on 16 February.
1949 – Formation of the NSW College of Nursing.
1949 – Formation of College of Nursing, Australia

1960s
1967 – New Zealand nursing undergo changes from being hospital-based apprenticeships to tertiary education institutions.

1970s
1971 – The Carpenter Report was released; a review released by New Zealand centred around the nursing education system, the report advocated training nurses in an educational environment.  The government however decided that polytechs, not universities, were more appropriate for this; however the consequences of this were that nurses were only diploma level not degree level.
1973 – Christchurch and Wellington Polytechnics offer diploma-level nursing education; Massey and Victoria Universities (Wellington) start their post-registration bachelor's degrees.
1975 – First nursing diploma program in Australia in a College of Advanced Education (CAE) in Melbourne, followed quickly by programs in New South Wales, South Australia and Western Australia.

1980s
1980 – The Roper, Logan and Tierney model of nursing, based upon the activities of daily living, is published.
1983 – The importance of human rights in nursing is made explicit in a statement adopted by the International Council of Nurses.
1983 – UKCC becomes the profession's new regulatory body in the UK.
1988 – Anne Casey develops her child-centered nursing model while working as a paediatric oncology nurse in London.
1989 – Nurses' Health Study 2 begins.

1990s
1990 – Last student graduated from New Zealand hospital program.
1992 – "Cultural safety" was made a requirement for nursing and midwifery education programs by the Nursing Council of New Zealand. Cultural safety allows effective nursing of patients and/or family members of those of another culture by a nurse who has reflected on one's own cultural identity and understands the impact of differing cultures in nursing practice and patient care. (Papps & Ramsden, 1996)
1992 – The Australian and New Zealand national governments signed a Mutual Recognition Agreement. (Daly, Speedy & Jackson, 2010)
1996 – The Flight Nurse Association was created by the New Zealand Nurses Organisation (NZNO) to recognise the need of training and education of the same standards throughout New Zealand.

21st century

2000s
2000 – Review of undergraduate nursing education by New Zealand Nursing Council
2002 – Deborah Harris, New Zealand's first Nurse Practitioner.
2004 – The Health Practitioners Competence Assurance (2003) Act comes into full power on 18 September, in New Zealand, these cover the requirements for nurses to have current competences relating to their scope of practice.
2005 – The Nursing Council of New Zealand published a comprehensive guideline on cultural safety in nursing education and practice.
2010 – A national registration for all nurses and midwives comes into force in Australia in July 2010. (Daly, Speedy & Jackson, 2010)
2010 – Nurses' Health Study 3 begins enrolling: Female RNs, LPNs, and nursing students 20–46 are encouraged to join this long-term women's health study. Study remains open until 100,000 nurses are enrolled.

References

Bibliography
Allan, V. (2004). A new way of living: the history of the Spinal Injuries Unit in Christchurch. The Guttmann Story (pp. 7). Christchurch, New Zealand: Canterbury District Health Board.
Bullough, Vern L. and Bullough, Bonnie. The Care of the Sick: The Emergence of Modern Nursing (1978).
Craven, Ruth F., & Hirnle, Constance J. (2007). Fundamentals of nursing: Human health and function (5th ed). Philadelphia, PA: Lippincott Williams & Wilkins.
Craven, R F., & Hirnle, C J. (2009) Fundamentals of nursing: Human health and function (6th ed). Philadelphia, PA: Lippincott Williams & Wilkins.
Crisp, J., & Taylor, C. (2009).  Potter & Perry's fundamental of nursing (3rd ed.).  Chatswood, Australia : Elsevier Australia.
Crisp, J., Taylor, C., Douglas, C., Rebeiro, G. (2013). Potter & Perry's fundamentals of nursing (4th ed.). Elsevier Australia.
Dingwall, Robert, Anne Marie Rafferty, Charles Webster. An Introduction to the Social History of Nursing (Routledge, 1988)
Donahue, M. Patricia. Nursing, The Finest Art: An Illustrated History (3rd ed. 2010), includes over 400 illustrations; 416pp
Harris, Kirsty. Girls in Grey: Surveying Australian Military Nurses in World War I  History Compass (Jan 2013) 11#1 PP 14–23, online free, with detailed bibliography
Papps, E., (2002). Nursing in New Zealand. Auckland, New Zealand: Pearson Education New Zealand.
Papps, E., & Ramsden, I. (1996). International Journal for Quality Healthcare. Vol 8, No 5, pp. 491–497
Wood, Pamela J. and Maralyn Foureur. "Exploring the maternity archive of the St Helens Hospital, Wellington, New Zealand, 1907–22," in New Directions in the History of Nursing: International Perspectives'' ed by Barbara Mortimer and Susan McGann. (Routledge, 2004) pp 179–93 online

Further reading
Alexander Turnbull Library. (n.d.). New Zealand nurses and medical officers. Retrieved 21 February 2012, from New Zealand History
Sciencemuseum (n.d). Brought to life: Exploring the history of medicine

Nursing history in Australia and New Zealand
Nursing
Nursing
Nursing
Nursing in Australia
Nursing in New Zealand
History of nursing